Neville Jetta (born 12 February 1990) is a former Australian rules footballer who played for the Melbourne Football Club in the Australian Football League (AFL).

Jetta was drafted by Melbourne with the 51st selection in the 2008 national draft. He had previously been playing with Swan Districts in the West Australian Football League (WAFL).  In September 2008 he was awarded the Mel Whinnen Medal for being the best player in the Swans colts grand final win.

Both Jetta and fellow Melbourne draftee Jamie Bennell come from Bunbury and attended the same primary school. Jetta is the cousin of Lewis Jetta of the West Coast Eagles and also a distant cousin of Leroy Jetta, who played for Essendon.

Jetta and Bennell were both named to make their AFL debuts together in the opening round of the 2009 AFL season.

During the 2013 AFL season, Jetta fell out of favour at the Demons, playing only five games due to form and being unable to find a permanent position. This led to Jetta being delisted at the season's end. Due to the appointment of Paul Roos as senior coach, Jetta was provided with another chance and was redrafted as a rookie for the 2014 AFL season.

During the 2014 AFL season, Jetta was promoted to the senior list due to injuries to Jesse Hogan and Mitch Clark. Jetta cemented a spot in Melbourne's back six where he arguably played the best football of his career playing as a small defender, successfully negating small forwards such as Eddie Betts, Chad Wingard and Luke Dahlhaus.

On 27 September 2021, Jetta announced his retirement from the AFL. As of October 5th, Jetta was added to the Collingwood team as a new development coach.

Statistics
 Statistics are correct to the end of round 15, 2021

|- style="background:#eaeaea;"
! scope="row" style="text-align:center" | 2009
|
| 39 || 15 || 7 || 8 || 115 || 64 || 179 || 43 || 39 || 0.5 || 0.5 || 7.7 || 4.3 || 11.9 || 2.9 || 2.6
|-
! scope="row" style="text-align:center" | 2010
|
| 39 || 6 || 6 || 1 || 47 || 36 || 83 || 15 || 26 || 1.0 || 0.2 || 7.8 || 6.0 || 13.8 || 2.5 || 4.3
|- style="background:#eaeaea;"
! scope="row" style="text-align:center" | 2011
|
| 39 || 9 || 5 || 3 || 56 || 64 || 120 || 34 || 42 || 0.6 || 0.3 || 6.2 || 7.1 || 13.3 || 3.8 || 4.7
|-
! scope="row" style="text-align:center" | 2012
|
| 39 || 6 || 1 || 0 || 39 || 21 || 60 || 21 || 15 || 0.2 || 0.0 || 6.5 || 3.5 || 10.0 || 3.5 || 2.5
|- style="background:#eaeaea;"
! scope="row" style="text-align:center" | 2013
|
| 39 || 5 || 0 || 1 || 26 || 18 || 44 || 9 || 20 || 0.0 || 0.2 || 5.2 || 3.6 || 8.8 || 1.8 || 4.0
|-
! scope=row style=text-align:center | 2014
|
| 39 || 16 || 1 || 0 || 100 || 108 || 208 || 50 || 60 || 0.1 || 0.0 || 6.3 || 6.8 || 13.0 || 3.1 || 3.8
|- style="background:#eaeaea;"
! scope="row" style="text-align:center" | 2015
|
| 39 || 16 || 1 || 0 || 76 || 116 || 192 || 43 || 41 || 0.1 || 0.0 || 4.7 || 7.3 || 12.0 || 2.7 || 2.6
|-
! scope=row style=text-align:center | 2016
|
| 39 || 21 || 0 || 3 || 163 || 172 || 335 || 78 || 63 || 0.0 || 0.1 || 7.8 || 8.2 || 16.0 || 3.7 || 3.0
|- style="background:#eaeaea;"
! scope="row" style="text-align:center" | 2017
|
| 39 || 22 || 3 || 0 || 151 || 164 || 315 || 94 || 68 || 0.1 || 0.0 || 6.9 || 7.5 || 14.4 || 4.3 || 3.1
|-
! scope=row style=text-align:center | 2018
|
| 39 || 25 || 0 || 1 || 142 || 155 || 297 || 75 || 79 || 0.0 || 0.0 || 5.7 || 6.2 || 11.9 || 3.0 || 3.2
|- style="background:#eaeaea;"
! scope="row" style="text-align:center" | 2019
|
| 39 || 7 || 0 || 0 || 39 || 36 || 75 || 19 || 20 || 0.0 || 0.0 || 5.6 || 5.1 || 10.7 || 2.7 || 2.9
|-
! scope=row style=text-align:center | 2020
|
| 39 || 6 || 0 || 0 || 14 || 23 || 37 || 6 || 8 || 0.0 || 0.0 || 2.3 || 3.8 || 6.2 || 1.0 || 1.3
|- style="background:#eaeaea;"
! scope="row" style="text-align:center" | 2021
|
| 39 || 5 || 0 || 0 || 20 || 20 || 40 || 13 || 7 || 0.0 || 0.0 || 4.0 || 4.0 || 8.0 || 2.6 || 1.4
|- class="sortbottom"
! colspan=3| Career
! 159
! 24
! 17
! 988
! 997
! 1985
! 500
! 487
! 0.2
! 0.1
! 6.2
! 6.3
! 12.5
! 3.1
! 3.1
|}

Notes

Personal life

Jetta has a daughter and a son. He married his partner Samantha on 20 October 2013.

References

External links

Melbourne Football Club players
Living people
1990 births
Indigenous Australian players of Australian rules football
Swan Districts Football Club players
Casey Demons players
People from Bunbury, Western Australia
Australian rules footballers from Western Australia
Bunbury Football Club players
Carey Park Football Club players
Australia international rules football team players